Mozdok (Mæzdæg; Kabardian: Мэздэгу) is a town and the administrative center of Mozdoksky District of North Ossetia – Alania, Russia, located on the left shore of the Terek River,  north of the republic's capital Vladikavkaz. As of the 2010 Census, its population was 38,768.

Etymology
The town's name comes from "мэз дэгу (mez dugu)", a Kabardian word meaning "the dense forest".

History
During the reign of Catherine II the Russian army started entering Circassian soil and Russia started building forts in an attempt to quickly annex Circassia. In 1763, Russian forces occupied the village of Mezdeug in Eastern Circassia, and established Mozdok as a Russian fort, settling the families of the Volga Cossacks in stanitsas around it. Thus, the Russo-Circassian War began.

In 1764, the Kabardian leaders' request to the Russian government that the fortress be destroyed went unanswered. In the years that followed, the Kabardians tried to besiege the town, but they were eventually compelled to retreat. With the foundation of Mozdok, Russian authorities encouraged Ossetians, Georgians, Armenians, Spiritual Christians and other Christians to populate the town. It soon emerged as a key Russian military outpost linked to Kizlyar with a fortified line as well as the center of local trade, ethnic diversity, and Russian-Caucasian interchange. In 1789, 55.6% of its population was Armenian and Georgian. Ossetian settlement particularly increased in the 1820s when the Russian commander Yermolov began removing Kabardians from the area of the Georgian Military Road and settling Ossetians there.

Moving south from Mozdok, Russia established contact with eastern Georgia through the Darial Gorge. Mozdok remained the northern terminal of the Georgian Military Road leading to Tbilisi until being succeeded by Vladikavkaz, founded in 1784 midway between Mozdok and the Darial Pass. During the Russian Empire, the town was the administrative capital of the Mozdoksky Otdel of the Terek Oblast.

Brothers Dubinin create world's first oil refining apparatus in 1823.

On August 23, 1942, it was conquered by German troops during Case Blue. It was recaptured by the Red Army on January 3, 1943.

In June 2003, a suicide bomber caused havoc in the town, when a bus full of Russian air force personnel was destroyed when it was rammed by the bomber's car. On August 1, 2003, a military hospital in the city was targeted by a suicide bomber driving a large truck bomb. The building was substantially damaged and over fifty people were killed in the blast. These attacks are just two of a string of attacks on Russian facilities in Mozdok since the start of the Second Chechen War.

Administrative and municipal status
Within the framework of administrative divisions, Mozdok serves as the administrative center of Mozdoksky District. As an administrative division, it is incorporated within Mozdoksky District as Mozdok Town Under District Jurisdiction. As a municipal division, Mozdok Town Under District Jurisdiction is incorporated within Mozdoksky Municipal District as Mozdokskoye Urban Settlement.

Culture
The Museum of Regional Studies in Mozdok holds an assortment of displays and artifacts related to Mozdok's history.

Ethnic groups
As of 2002, the ethnic composition of Mozdok was as follows:
Russians: 62.7%
Ossetians: 7.7%
Armenians: 6.1%
Kumyks: 4.6%
Chechens: 4.3%
Kabardians: 3.2%
Koreans: 2.4%

Military
There is an airbase near the town. From 1961 to 1998, the 182nd Heavy Bomber Aviation Regiment of Long Range Aviation, flying Tupolev Tu-95s, was based there. The airbase has been used to support military operations in Chechnya during the First Chechen War, Second Chechen War, and in the Russo-Georgian War. In June 2003, a female suicide bomber targeted a bus carrying pilots and other personnel employed at the airbase on the Mozdok-Prokhladnoye motorway, killing approximately 15 and wounding 12.

References

Notes

Sources

External links
China Daily comments on the attacks

Cities and towns in North Ossetia–Alania
Terek Oblast
Populated places established in 1759
Terrorist incidents in Russia in 2003
1763 establishments in the Russian Empire